East Corridor is a 1966 Soviet war film directed by .

Plot 
The film takes place during the Second World War. The film tells about the Belarusian underground, which the Nazis are trying to set against each other.

Cast 
  as Lena 
 Regimantas Adomaitis as Ivan
  as Zhenya 
 Gleb Glebov as Zyazyulya
 Boris Markov as Yegor
 Yelena Rysina as Freda
 Valentina Titova as Lyudmila
 Vladimir Kashpur as Konstantin

References

External links 
 
1966 films
1960s Russian-language films
Soviet war films
Soviet World War II films
Belarusian World War II films
Soviet-era Belarusian films

Soviet black-and-white films
Belarusfilm films
Holocaust films